Aktogay District is a district of Karaganda Region in central Kazakhstan. The administrative center of the district is the selo of Aktogay. Population:

Geography
Aksoran, the highest point of the Kyzylarai massif of the Kazakh Uplands, is located in the district. The larger Kyzyltas range rises to the northwest of it.

References

Districts of Kazakhstan
Karaganda Region